The Luzon striped rat (Chrotomys whiteheadi) is a species of rodent in the family Muridae.
It is found only in the Philippines.
Its natural habitat is subtropical or tropical dry forest.

References

Rats of Asia
Endemic fauna of the Philippines
Fauna of Luzon
Rodents of the Philippines
Mammals described in 1895
Taxa named by Oldfield Thomas
Taxonomy articles created by Polbot
Chrotomys